Salix retusa is a species of flowering plant in the family Salicaceae.

Description
This plant usually develops creeping stems, rarely erect. The dull green leaves are obovate, lanceolate or elliptic, with entire margins, 2 × 1 cm, with very short petioles. Like all willows this species is dioecious. Catkins are broadly cylindrical, with yellow anthers. Flowers bloom from June to July.

Distribution
It is present in the mountains of central and southern Europe including the Pyrenees and the mountains of Bulgaria.

Habitat

References

Pignatti S. - Flora d'Italia (3 voll.) - Edagricole – 1982
Christoper Brickell (Editor-in-chief): RHS A-Z Encyclopedia of Garden Plants. Third edition. Dorling Kindersley, London 2003

External links
Biolib
Alpine Plant Encyclopaedia

retusa
Flora of Southwestern Europe
Flora of the Pyrenees
Plants described in 1759
Taxa named by Carl Linnaeus